Ijahman Levi (born Trevor Sutherland: 21 June 1946 in Christiana, Manchester, Jamaica) is a reggae musician. In his early years, Levi was tutored by musician and vocal teacher, Joe Higgs. His first album, Haile I Hymn, was released on Island Records in 1978. He became Ijahman Levi after a religious conversion to Rastafari when he was in prison between 1972 and 1974. It and his following records preach Rastafari movement as well as Twelve Tribes of Israel doctrine.

Biography
Levi moved with his parents to the United Kingdom in 1963. In 1966 and 1969 he released two singles under the name of The Youth. The first one was in 1966 for Polydor 56121 "As Long As There is Love" c/w "Your One and Only Man", both covers of Jimmy Ruffin and Otis Redding songs. Ijahman has mentioned he is a great Otis Redding fan. They were cut in a typical mod R&B soul style. His second single was for Deram 226, released 17 January 1969, and featured "Meadow of My Love" c/w "Love Me or Leave Me". The B-side was self-written, being credited to 'Sutherland'. In 1985 Levi released "I Do", a duet he recorded with his second wife, Madge. The song performed well on the British reggae charts, reaching top position. Ijahman’s most famous composition is "Jah Heavy Load" recorded and released in 1976.

Discography 

 1978 - Haile I Hymn (Chapter 1)
 1978 - Haile I Hymn (Chapter 2)
 1979 - Are we a Warrior
 1982 - Tell it to the Children
 1984 - Lilly of my Valley
 1985 - Africa
 1986 - I Do (Ijahman and Madge)
 1987 - Forward Rastaman
 1987 - Culture Country
 1988 - Ijahman and Friends
 1988 - Over Europe Live
 1989 - Inside Out
 1991 - On Track
 1991 - Love Smiles
 1992 - Kingfari
 1993 - Entitlement
 1993 - Gemini Man
 1994 - Two Double Six
 1994 - Black Royalties
 1995 - Home Free by Madge
 1995 - Live in Paris 1994
 1995 - Ijahman Sings Bob Marley
 1996 - Ijahman & Bob Marley in Dub
 1997 - Live at Reggae on the River
 1997 - Beauty and the Lion
 1997 - Lion Dub Beauty
 1998 - Crocodile Man
 1998 - Monkey Man
 2000 - Arkart
 2001 - The Roots of Love
 2006 - Versatile Life

References

Jamaican reggae musicians
Performers of Rastafarian music
Living people
1946 births
People from Manchester Parish
Jamaican Rastafarians
Roots Reggae Library
Jamaican emigrants to the United Kingdom
Converts to the Rastafari movement